The men's discus throw event was part of the track and field athletics programme at the 1936 Summer Olympics. The competition was held on August 5, 1936. Thirty-one athletes from 17 nations competed. The maximum number of athletes per nation had been set at 3 since the 1930 Olympic Congress. The final was won by Ken Carpenter of the United States. It was the nation's fourth consecutive, and seventh overall, victory in the men's discus throw; it was also the second consecutive Games that the Americans finished with both of the top two places, as Gordon Dunn took silver. Giorgio Oberweger earned Italy's first men's discus throw medal with his bronze.

Background

This was the 10th appearance of the event, which is one of 12 athletics events to have been held at every Summer Olympics. The returning finalists from 1932 were bronze medalist Paul Winter and fourth-place finisher Jules Noël of France and sixth-place finisher Endre Madarász of Hungary. The favorites were Harald Andersson of Sweden ("dominant" in 1934 and 1935, with two world records in one day in 1934) and Willy Schröder of Germany (who had broken Andersson's record in 1935).

The Republic of China and Liechtenstein each made their debut in the men's discus throw. The United States made its 10th appearance, having competed in every edition of the Olympic men's discus throw to date.

Competition format

The competition introduced a true two-round format, with the qualifying round completely separate from the divided final (though the official report describes the competition as having three phases, with the final being a "semi-finals" and "final"). In qualifying, each athlete received three attempts; those recording a mark of at least 44.00 metres advanced to the final. The results of the qualifying round were then ignored. Finalists received three throws each, with the top six competitors receiving an additional three attempts. The best distance among those six throws counted.

Records

These were the standing world and Olympic records (in metres) prior to the 1932 Summer Olympics.

Ken Carpenter broke the Olympic record by throwing 50.48 metres in the fourth throw of the final.

Schedule

Results

Qualifying

Distances are estimated.

Final

References

Athletics at the 1936 Summer Olympics
Discus throw at the Olympics
Men's events at the 1936 Summer Olympics